The Judo competition at the 2006 Central American and Caribbean Games was held in Cartagena, Colombia. The tournament was scheduled to be held from 25–29 July at the Coliseo de Gimnasia y Deportes de Combate, Unidad Deportiva Pedro de Heredia in Cartagena. This was the first time that the regional games held the Kata division.

Medal summary

Men's events

Women's events

References

External links

2006 Central American and Caribbean Games
Central American and Caribbean Games
2006
Judo competitions in Colombia